Dow Dangeh or Do Dangeh or Dodangeh may refer to:
Do Dangeh, Golestan
Dodangeh-ye Bozorg, Khuzestan Province
Dodangeh-ye Kuchak, Khuzestan Province
Dow Dangeh, Lorestan
Dodangeh District, Mazandaran Province, Iran
Dodangeh Rural District (East Azerbaijan Province), Iran
Dodangeh Rural District (Khuzestan Province), Iran

See also
Dodangeh (disambiguation)